The Sheraton Columbus Hotel at Capitol Square is a highrise hotel on Capitol Square in Downtown Columbus, Ohio. The building, constructed along with the Capitol Square skyscraper in the 1980s, houses a Sheraton hotel and Starbucks coffee shop. The site was formerly home to the Hartman Building and Theater.

History
The hotel opened on January 16, 1984 as the Hyatt on Capitol Square. It was constructed along with the Capitol Square skyscraper on the site of the Hartman Building and Hartman Theatre, as part of the Capitol South redevelopment.

The Hyatt was purchased out of receivership on July 7, 2011 by Driftwood Hospitality Management for $19.5 million. They converted the property to a Sheraton and undertook a year-long $9.5 million renovation, completed in January 2013.

Gallery

References

External links

 
Emporis
Skyscraperpage

Buildings in downtown Columbus, Ohio
Hotels established in 1984
Hotel buildings completed in 1984
Sheraton hotels
Brutalist architecture in Ohio
Hotels in Columbus, Ohio